The 2012–13 San Mig Coffee Mixers season was the 25th season of the franchise in the Philippine Basketball Association (PBA).

Key dates
August 19: The 2012 PBA Draft took place in Robinson's Midtown Mall, Manila.
August 20: San Miguel-Purefoods Company, Inc. announced that they will rename the B-Meg Llamados as the San Mig Coffee Mixers.

Draft picks

Roster

Philippine Cup

Eliminations

Standings

Game log
Total: 10–4

|- bgcolor="#bbffbb" 
| 1
|  October 5
|  Alaska
|  103–83
|  de Ocampo (22)
|  de Ocampo (13)
|  Villanueva (7)
|  Smart Araneta Coliseum
|  1–0
|  Boxscore
|- bgcolor="#bbffbb" 
| 2
|  October 14
|  Petron Blaze
|  90–84
|  Yap (18)
|  de Ocampo (7)
|  Villanueva (5)
|  Smart Araneta Coliseum
|  2–0
|  Boxscore
|- bgcolor="#edbebf" 
| 3
|  October 20
|  Talk 'N Text
|  74–85
|  Yap (18)
|  de Ocampo (10)
|  Simon, Barroca (4)
|  Ynares Center
|  2–1
|  Boxscore
|- bgcolor="#edbebf" 
| 4
|  October 24
|  Rain or Shine
|  79–80
|  Yap (28)
|  Reavis (11)
|  de Ocampo (4)
|  Smart Araneta Coliseum
|  2–2
|  Boxscore
|- bgcolor="#bbffbb"  
| 5
|  October 28
|  Barako Bull
|  92–91
|  Yap (21)
|  de Ocampo (8)
|  Barroca (4)
|  Smart Araneta Coliseum
|  3–2
|  Boxscore
|- bgcolor="#bbffbb" 
| 6
|  October 31
|  GlobalPort
|  82–78
|  Pingris (17)
|  Pingris (16)
|  Devance, Barroca (4)
|  Smart Araneta Coliseum
|  4–2
|  Boxscore

|- bgcolor="#bbffbb"  
| 7
|  November 4
|  Barangay Ginebra
|  78–68
|  Devance (18)
|  Pingris (9)
|  de Ocampo (6)
|  Smart Araneta Coliseum
|  5–2
|  Boxscore
|- bgcolor="#bbffbb"  
| 8
|  November 10
|  Alaska
|  77–68
|  Devance (18)
|  Pingris (13)
|  Simon, Pingris (3)
|  Lapu-Lapu City
|  6–2
|  Boxscore
|- bgcolor="#bbffbb" 
| 9
|  November 16
|  Barako Bull
|  93–73
|  Yap (22)
|  Yap (9)
|  Barroca (4)
|  Ynares Center
|  7–2
|  Boxscore
|- bgcolor="#edbebf" 
| 10
|  November 21
|  Talk 'N Text
|  63–92
|  Yap (13)
|  Devance (14)
|  Intal (5)
|  Smart Araneta Coliseum
|  7–3
|  Boxscore
|- bgcolor="#bbffbb"  
| 11
|  November 23
|  Air21
|  89–80
|  Yap (20)
|  Devance (11)
|  Devance (5)
|  Smart Araneta Coliseum
|  8–3
|  Boxscore

|- bgcolor="#bbffbb"  
| 12
|  December 2
|  Rain or Shine
|  93–92
|  Simon (24)
|  de Ocampo (13)
|  Barroca (7)
|  Smart Araneta Coliseum
|  9–3
|  Boxscore
|- bgcolor="#bbffbb"  
| 13
|  December 7
|  GlobalPort
|  107–96
|  Simon (27)
|  de Ocampo (13)
|  Devance (10)
|  Mall of Asia Arena
|  10–3
|  Boxscore
|- bgcolor="#edbebf" 
| 14
|  December 9
|  Meralco
|  77–87
|  Simon (19)
|  Simon, Barroca, de Ocampo, Pingris (5)
|  Villanueva (5)
|  Smart Araneta Coliseum
|  10–4
|  Boxscore

Playoffs

Bracket

Game log

|- bgcolor="#bbffbb" 
| 1
|  December 13
|  Petron Blaze
|  92–87*
|  Yap (23)
|  Pingris (11)
|  Devance (5)
|  Smart Araneta Coliseum
|  1–0
|  Boxscore

|- bgcolor="#edbebf" 
| 1
|  December 19
|  Rain or Shine
|  83–91
|  de Ocampo (17)
|  Yap, 2 others (7)
|  de Ocampo, Barroca (4)
|  Smart Araneta Coliseum
|  0–1
|  Boxscore
|- bgcolor="#bbffbb" 
| 2
|  December 21
|  Rain or Shine
|  106–82
|  Yap (34)
|  Yap (10)
|  Barroca (8)
|  Mall of Asia Arena
|  1–1
|  Boxscore
|- bgcolor="#edbebf" 
| 3
|  December 25
|  Rain or Shine
|  72–98
|  Simon (22)
|  Devance (8)
|  Simon (4)
|  Mall of Asia Arena
|  1–2
|  Boxscore
|- bgcolor="#edbebf"
| 4
|  December 28
|  Rain or Shine
|  74–83
|  Yap (20)
|  Pingris (13)
|  Pingris (4)
|  Mall of Asia Arena
|  1–3
|  Boxscore
|- bgcolor="#bbffbb" 
| 5
|  December 30
|  Rain or Shine
|  79–67
|  Devance (20)
|  Simon (11)
|  Devance (4)
|  Mall of Asia Arena
|  2–3
|  Boxscore
|- bgcolor="#edbebf"
| 6
|  January 3
|  Rain or Shine
|  83–90
|  Simon (29)
|  Pingris (11)
|  Barroca (5)
|  Mall of Asia Arena
|  2–4
|  Boxscore

Commissioner's Cup

Eliminations

Standings

Game log
Total: 8–6

|- bgcolor="#edbebf" 
| 1
|  February 8
|  Barako Bull
|  75–79
|  Yap (19)
|  Simon (11)
|  Devance (7)
|  Smart Araneta Coliseum
|  0–1
|  Boxscore
|- bgcolor="#edbebf" 
| 2
|  February 13
|  Petron Blaze
|  73–98
|  Yap (25)
|  Rogers (9)
|  Devance (4)
|  Smart Araneta Coliseum
|  0–2
|  Boxscore
|- bgcolor="#edbebf" 
| 3
|  February 22
|  Rain or Shine
|  65–93
|  Mallari (15)
|  Bowles (14)
|   Pingris, Pacana (3)
|  Mall of Asia Arena
|  0–3
|  Boxscore
|- bgcolor="#bbffbb" 
| 4
|  February 24
|  Talk 'N Text
|  90–82
|  Bowles (29)
|  Bowles (23)
|  Barroca (5)
|  Smart Araneta Coliseum
|  1–3
|  Boxscore

|- bgcolor="#bbffbb" 
| 5
|  March 2
|  GlobalPort
|  91–84
|  Simon (19)
|  Bowles (7)
|  Pingris, Devance (4)
|  Naga, Camarines Sur
|  2–3
|  Boxscore
|- bgcolor="#bbffbb" 
| 6
|  March 6
|  Alaska
|  75–68
|  Bowles (16)
|  Bowles (11)
|  Bowles (5)
|  Smart Araneta Coliseum
|  3–3
|  Boxscore
|- bgcolor="#edbebf" 
| 7
|  March 10
|  Barangay Ginebra
|  88–96
|  Bowles (25)
|  Bowles (16)
|  Barroca (5)
|  Smart Araneta Coliseum
|  3–4
|  Boxscore
|- bgcolor="#bbffbb" 
| 8
|  March 15
|  Meralco
|  76–71
|  Bowles (23)
|  Bowles, Pingris (16)
|  Barroca (4)
|  Smart Araneta Coliseum
|  4–4
|  Boxscore
|- bgcolor="#edbebf"
| 9
|  March 20
|  Air21
|  82–87
|  Bowles (24)
|  Bowles (12)
|  Bowles, Reavis, Pingris (3)
|  Smart Araneta Coliseum
|  4–5
|  Boxscore
|- bgcolor="#bbffbb" 
| 10
|  March 23
|  Alaska
|  84–83
|  Bowles (30)
|  Bowles (23)
|  Pingris (6)
|  Smart Araneta Coliseum
|  5–5
| Boxscore
|-   bgcolor="#edbebf"
| 11
|  March 31
|  Barako Bull
|  100–105
|  Bowles (24)
|  Bowles (18)
|  Barroca (6)
|  Mall of Asia Arena
|  5–6
| Boxscore

|- bgcolor="#bbffbb"
| 12
|  April 3
|  Talk N' Text
|  83–82
|  Bowles (18)
|  Pingris (10)
|  Barroca (5)
|  Smart Araneta Coliseum
|  6–6
|  Boxscore
|- bgcolor="#bbffbb"
| 13
|  April 10 
|  Air 21 
|  80–66
|  Bowles (29)
|  Bowles (16)
|  Devance (7)
|  Smart Araneta Coliseum
|  7–6
| Boxscore
|- bgcolor="#bbffbb"
| 14
|  April 13
|  Meralco 
|  97–90
|  Bowles (27)
|  Bowles (17)
|  Barroca (10)
|  Smart Araneta Coliseum
|  8–6
|  Boxscore

Playoffs

Bracket

Game log

|- bgcolor="#edbebf"
| 1
|  April 19
|  Meralco
|  85–88 
|  Bowles (37)
|  Bowles (18)
|  Ross (8)
|  Smart Araneta Coliseum
|  0–1
|  Boxscore
|- bgcolor="#bbffbb"
| 2
|  April 21
|  Meralco
|  100–92
|  Bowles (35)
|  Bowles (14)
|  Simon, Barroca, Yap, & Devance (4)
|  Smart Araneta Coliseum
|  1–1
|  Boxscore
|- bgcolor="#bbffbb"
| 3
|  April 24
|  Meralco
|  90–82
|  Bowles (23)
|  Bowles (11)
|  Pingris, Devance (5)
|  Smart Araneta Coliseum
|  2–1
|  Boxscore

|- bgcolor="#bbffbb"
| 1
|  April 27
|  Alaska
|   71–69
|   Simon (15)
|  Bowles (13)
|  Barroca & Yap (8)
|  Smart Araneta Coliseum
|  1–0
|  Boxscore
|- bgcolor="#edbebf"
| 2
|  April 29
|  Alaska
|  67–86
|  Devance & Simon (15)
|  Bowles (17)
|  Simon, Bowles, Yap, Mallari, & De Ocampo (2)
|  Smart Araneta Coliseum
|  1–1
|  Boxscore
|- bgcolor="#edbebf"
| 3
|  May 8
|  Alaska
|  82–89
|  Bowles (19)
|  Bowles & Pingris (15)
|  Barroca & Pingris (6)
|  Smart Araneta Coliseum
|  1–2
|  Boxscore
|- bgcolor="#edbebf"
| 4
|  May 11
|  Alaska
|  78–83
|  Bowles (23)
|  Bowles (22)
|  Barroca (7)
|  Smart Araneta Coliseum
|  1–3
|  Boxscore

Governors' Cup

Eliminations

Standings

Game log
Total: 6–3

|- bgcolor="#edbebf"  
| 1
|  August 14
|  Rain or Shine
| 75–79
|  Blakely (26)
|  Blakely (20)
|  Barroca (6)
|  Mall of Asia Arena
|  0–1
|  Boxscore
|- bgcolor="#edbebf"
| 2
|  August 17
|  Air21
|  93–82
|  Blakely (37)
|  Blakely (25)
|  Barroca (7)
|  Ynares Center
|  0–2
|  Boxscore
|- bgcolor= "#bbffbb"
| 3
|  August 25
|  Talk 'N Text
|  118–99
|  Blakely (24)
|  Blakely (17)
|  Blakely (8)
|  Mall of Asia Arena
|  1–2
|  Recap
|- bgcolor="#edbebf"
| 4
|  August 31
|  Petron Blaze
|  83–89
|  Blakely (25)
|  Blakely (14)
|  Blakely (7)
|  Mall of Asia Arena
|  1–3
|  Boxscore

|- bgcolor= "#bbffbb" 
| 5
|  September 4
|  GlobalPort
|  102–87
|  Blakely (25)
|  Blakely, Maliksi (9)
|   Blakely, Barroca (6)
|  Smart Araneta Coliseum
|  2–3
|  Boxscore
|- bgcolor= "#bbffbb" 
| 6
|  September 8
|  Ginebra
|  89–86
|  Blakely (30)
|  Blakely (10)
|  Blakely, Barroca (3)
|  Smart Araneta Coliseum
|  3–3
|  Boxscore
|- bgcolor= "#bbffbb"
| 7
|  September 10
|  Alaska
|  95–82
|  Blakely (22)
|  Blakely (28)
|  Blakely (8)
|  Mall of Asia Arena
|  4–3
|  Boxscore
|- bgcolor= "#bbffbb" 
| 8
|  September 14
|  Barako Bull
|  81–77
|  Blakely (22)
|  Blakely (14)
|   Maliksi (5)
|  Ynares Center
|  5–3
|  Boxscore
|- bgcolor= "#bbffbb" 
| 9
|  September 20
|  Meralco
|  88–87
|  Blakely (24)
|  Blakely (13)
|  Reavis, Blakely, Pingris, Barroca (3)
|  Smart Araneta Coliseum
|  6–3
|  Boxscore

Playoffs

Bracket

Game log

|- bgcolor="#edbebf"
| 1
|  September 25
|  Alaska
|  105–112
|  Blakely (27)
|  Blakely (12)
|  Blakely (7)
|  Smart Araneta Coliseum
|  0–1
|  Boxscore
|- bgcolor="#bbffbb"
| 2
|  September 27
|  Alaska
|  83–73
|  Blakely (30)
|  Blakely (15)
|  Blakely, Mallari (3)
|  Mall of Asia Arena
|  1–1
|  Boxscore

|- bgcolor="#bbffbb" 
| 1
|  September 29
|  Meralco
|  83–73
|  Devance (17)
|  Blakely(10)
|  Pingris(4)
|  Smart Araneta Coliseum
|  1–0
|  Boxscore
|- bgcolor="#edbebf"
| 2
|  October 1
|  Meralco
|  69–73
|  Blakely (24)
|  Blakely (15)
|  Blakely, Barroca (5)
|  Smart Araneta Coliseum
|  1–1
|  Boxscore
|- bgcolor="#bbffbb"  
| 3
|  October 4
|  Meralco
|  94–87
|  Mallari (23)
|  Blakely (22)
|  Reavis (7)
|  Smart Araneta Coliseum
|  2–1
|  Boxscore
|- bgcolor="#bbffbb"  
| 4
|  October 6
|  Meralco
|  79–73
|  Blakely (23)
|  Blakely (19)
|  Pingris(4)
|  Smart Araneta Coliseum
|  3–1
|  Boxscore

|- bgcolor="#edbebf"
| 1
|  October 11
|  Petron Blaze
|  84–100
|  Blakely (23)
|  Blakely(14)
|  de Ocampo(6)
|  Mall of Asia Arena
|  0–1
|  Boxscore
|- bgcolor="#bbffbb"
| 2
|  October 13
|  Petron Blaze
|  100–93
|  Blakely (23)
|  Blakely (16)
|  Blakely (6)
|  Smart Araneta Coliseum
|  1–1
|  Boxscore
|- bgcolor="#edbebf"
| 3
|  October 16
|  Petron Blaze
|  68–90
|  Blakely (17)
|  Blakely (10)
|  Blakely, Pingris (4)
|  Smart Araneta Coliseum
|  1–2
|  Boxscore
|- bgcolor="#bbffbb"  
| 4
|  October 18
|  Petron Blaze
|  88–86
|  Blakely (19)
|  Blakely (13)
|  Blakely (6)
|  Mall of Asia Arena
|  2–2
|  –
|- bgcolor="#bbffbb"  
| 5
|  October 20
|  Petron Blaze
|  114–103
|  Blakely (30)
|  Blakely (15)
|  Barroca (10)
|  Smart Araneta Coliseum
|  3–2
|  Boxscore
|- bgcolor="#edbebf"
| 6
|  October 23
|  Petron Blaze
|  88–99
|  Blakely (21)
|  Blakely (11)
|  Mallari, Pingris (4)
|  Smart Araneta Coliseum
|  3–3
|  Boxscore
|- bgcolor="#bbffbb"  
| 7
|  October 25
|  Petron Blaze
|  87–77
|  Pingris, Blakely (19)
|  Pingris (17)
|  Barroca (4)
|  Smart Araneta Coliseum
|  4–3
|  –

Transactions

Trades

Pre-season

Commissioner's Cup

Governors' Cup

Recruited imports

References

Magnolia Hotshots seasons
San Mig